Juliette Compton (May 3, 1899 – March 19, 1989) was an American actress whose career began in the silent film era and concluded with That Hamilton Woman in 1941.

Career
Compton was born in Columbus, Georgia, on May 3, 1899. She was a model for illustrator Harrison Fisher, and perhaps his favorite model.

Compton's show business career began when she acted in The Kiss Burglar in New York. That was followed by a season in the Ziegfeld Follies. In London, she appeared on stage for three years, including acting in The League of Notions and went on to act in British films for five years.

Financial problems
On January 4, 1927, a bankruptcy court in London, England, appointed an official receiver for Compton after presentation of evidence that she had no assets and had liabilities of $37,500. A news brief distributed by International News Service said that a nervous breakdown suffered by Compton was "attributed to difficulties in which she finds herself over debts."

Personal life
Compton married James Bartram, an Australian businessman, on December 24, 1926, in London, England. She left the nursing home where she had been ill for several weeks in order to be married at Christ Church, then returned to the nursing home immediately after the wedding. They separated in 1936 and divorced on March 25, 1942. 

She died in Pasadena, California.

Partial filmography

 The Wine of Life (1924) - Regine
 Her Redemption (1924) - Liana Vandry
 Human Desires (1924) - Andree de Vigne
 Afraid of Love (1925) - Ruth
 Trainer and Temptress (1925) - Lady Maurice
 The Third Round (1925) - Irma Peterson
 Nell Gwyn (1926) - Lady Castlemaine
 The Chinese Bungalow (1926) - Sadie
 The Woman Tempted (1926) - Louise Harding
 White Heat (1927) - Helen
 The Fake (1927) - Mrs. Hesketh Pointer
 Change of Heart (1928) - Lady Winham
 The Triumph of the Scarlet Pimpernel (1928) - Theresa Cabbarrus
 Woman to Woman (1929) - Vesta Compton
 Ladies of Leisure (1930) - Claire Collins
 Anybody's Woman (1930) - Ellen
 Morocco (1930) - Anna Dolores (uncredited)
 Unfaithful (1931) - Gemma Houston
 Kick In (1931) - Piccadilly Bessie
 The Vice Squad (1931) - Ambassador's Wife
 Women Love Once (1931) - Hester Dahlgren
 Rich Man's Folly (1931) - Paula Norcross
 Compromised (1931) - Connie Holt
 Husband's Holiday (1931) - Christine Kennedy
 No One Man (1932) - Sue Folsom
 Strangers in Love (1932) - Muriel Preston
 Westward Passage (1932) - Henrietta
 The Man Called Back (1932) - Vivien Lawrence
 Devil and the Deep (1932) - Mrs. Planet
 The Match King (1932) - Sonia Lombard
 Peg o' My Heart (1933) - Ethel Chichester
 The Masquerader (1933) - Lady Diana Joyce
 Berkeley Square (1933) - Duchess of Devonshire
 Grand Canary (1934) - Elissa Bayham
 The Count of Monte Cristo (1934) - Clothilde
 Behold My Wife (1934) - Diana Carter-Curson
 No More Ladies (1935) - Woman (uncredited)
 Irene (1940) - Mrs. Newlands Grey
 That Hamilton Woman (1941) - Lady Spencer (final film role)

References

External links

 (as Juliet Compton)

1899 births
1989 deaths
American film actresses
American silent film actresses
Actors from Columbus, Georgia
20th-century American actresses
Ziegfeld girls